The Royal Mile is a succession of streets forming the main thoroughfare of the Old Town of the city of Edinburgh in Scotland. The term was first used descriptively in W. M. Gilbert's Edinburgh in the Nineteenth Century (1901), describing the city "with its Castle and Palace and the royal mile between", and was further popularised as the title of a guidebook by R. T. Skinner published in 1920, "The Royal Mile (Edinburgh) Castle to Holyrood(house)".

The Royal Mile runs between two significant locations in the royal history of Scotland: Edinburgh Castle and Holyrood Palace. The name derives from it being the traditional processional route of monarchs, with a total length of approximately one Scots mile, a now obsolete measurement measuring 1.81km. The streets which make up the Royal Mile are (west to east) Castlehill, the Lawnmarket, the High Street, the Canongate and Abbey Strand. The Royal Mile is the busiest tourist street in the Old Town, rivalled only by Princes Street in the New Town.

Geography

Retreating ice sheets, many millennia ago, deposited their glacial debris behind the hard volcanic plug of the castle rock on which Edinburgh Castle stands, resulting in a distinctive crag and tail formation. Running eastwards from the crag on which the castle sits, the Royal Mile sits upon the ridge of the tail which slopes gently down to Holyrood Palace. Steep closes (or alleyways) run between the many tall lands (or tenement buildings) off the main thoroughfare.

Castle Esplanade and Castlehill

The Castle Esplanade was laid out as a parade ground, in 1753, using spoil from the building of the Royal Exchange (now the City Chambers). It was formalised in 1816 when it was widened and provided with decorative railings and walls. The Esplanade with its several monuments has been A-listed by Historic Scotland. It is the venue of the annual Edinburgh Military Tattoo at which time specially designed temporary grandstands are erected. Cannonball House has a cannonball lodged in the wall, often said to have been accidentally fired from the Castle but which actually marks the elevation of Comiston Springs, three miles to the south of the Castle, which fed a cistern on Castlehill, one of the first piped water supplies in Scotland.

From the Castle Esplanade, the short section of road entitled Castlehill is dominated by the former Tolbooth-Highland-St John's Church (on the south side at the foot of this section), now the headquarters of the Edinburgh International Festival society – The Hub, and on the north side by the Outlook Tower and Camera Obscura. The Assembly Hall of the Church of Scotland and New College are further down on the same side. The Scottish Parliament met in the Assembly Hall between 1999 and 2004.

Lawnmarket

The Lawnmarket is a separately named part of the High Street. Addresses are a continuation of the High Street numbers. It runs from the West Bow to St Giles Street.

A charter of 1477 designated this part of the High Street as the market-place for what was called "inland merchandise" - items such as yarn, stockings, coarse cloth and other similar articles. In later years, linen was the main product sold. As a result, it became known as the Land Market which was later corrupted to Lawn Market.

Today, the majority of shops in the street are aimed at tourists. On the north side is the preserved 17th century merchant's townhouse Gladstone's Land owned by the National Trust for Scotland. The lower end of the Lawnmarket is intersected by George IV Bridge on the right (south) and Bank Street on the left (north), leading to The Mound and the New Town. The view down Bank Street is closed by the baroque headquarters of the Bank of Scotland.

On the south-west corner of this intersection, with its entrance on George IV Bridge, is a modern hotel, replacing the former Lothian Regional Council offices. This building is of controversial design, winning both best building awards and the Carbuncle Cup in 2009–10.

Between Bank Street and St Giles Street, marking the end of the Lawnmarket, the High Court of Justiciary, Scotland's supreme criminal court, is housed in the Justiciary Building.

High Street

On the south side, about one-third of the way down from the Castle toward the Palace is Parliament Square, named after the old Parliament House which housed both the law courts and the old Parliament of Scotland between the 1630s and 1707 (when its existence was ended by the Act of Union). Parliament House now houses the Court of Session, Scotland's supreme civil court. St Giles' Cathedral, the High Kirk of Edinburgh, also stands in Parliament Square.

By the West Door of St Giles' is the Heart of Midlothian, a heart-shaped pattern built into the "setted" road, marking the site of the Old Tolbooth, formerly the centre of administration, taxation and justice in the burgh. The prison was described by Sir Walter Scott as the "Heart of Midlothian", and soon after demolition the city fathers marked the site with a heart mosaic. Locals have traditionally spat upon the heart's centre as a sign of contempt for the prison. On the north side, opposite St Giles', stand Edinburgh City Chambers, where the City of Edinburgh Council meets. On the south side, just past the High Kirk, is the Mercat Cross from which royal proclamations are read and the summoning of Parliament announced.

The whole south side of buildings from St Giles to the Tron Kirk had to be rebuilt or refaced in the 1820s following the Great Edinburgh Fire of 1824. This was done in a Georgian style, stepping down the hill.

The central focus of the Royal Mile is a major intersection with the Bridges.  North Bridge runs north over Waverley station to the New Town's Princes Street. South Bridge (which appears at street level to be simply a road with shops on either side—only one arch is visible from below) spans the Cowgate to the south, a street in a hollow below, and continues as Nicolson Street past the Old College building of the University of Edinburgh.

At John Knox's House the High Street narrows to a section of the street formerly known as the Netherbow, which, at its crossroads with Jeffrey Street (north) and St Mary's Street (south), marked the former city boundary. At this point stood the Netherbow Port, a fortified gateway between Edinburgh and the Canongate (until 1856 a separate burgh), which was removed in 1764 to improve traffic flow. The Scottish Storytelling Centre is a modern extension to John Knox House, owned by the Church of Scotland. It opened in 2006, replacing the former Netherbow Arts Centre, which itself replaced the Moray-Knox Church in the 1960s. Following the English victory over the Scots at the Battle of Flodden in 1513, a city wall was built around Edinburgh known as the Flodden Wall, some parts of which survive. The Netherbow Port was a gateway in this wall and brass studs in the road mark its former position. On the corner of St Mary's Street is the World's End Pub which takes its name from the adjacent World's End Close, whimsically so named because this was in former times the last close in Edinburgh before entering the Canongate.

Entertainment for the wedding of Mary, Queen of Scots, in 1558
There was a triumph or show at the Salt Tron and other locations on the Royal Mile to celebrate the marriage of Mary, Queen of Scots and Francis II of France, on 3 July April 1558. The wedding itself took place in Paris on 24 April 1558. The Edinburgh entertainment was written and produced by William Lauder and William Adamson. Walter Binning painted the "play cart" for actors portraying the signs of the seven planets and Cupid. Artificial "summer trees" decorated with fruit made from tennis balls covered with gold foil or leaf were placed on four stages. The seven planets had been portrayed in a show in Paris after the wedding.

Other 16th-century royal entertainments at the Tron and on the Royal Mile include the Entry of Mary, Queen of Scots (1561), the Entry of James VI (1579), and the Entry of Anne of Denmark (1590).

Murders of Note

Several infamous murders have taken place on the central section of the Royal Mile:

George Lockhart, Lord Carnwath murdered by John Chieslie in 1689
James Mackcoull murdered William Begbie in 1806 in the close leading to Tweeddale Court
World's End Close double murder in 1977 by Angus Sinclair

Canongate

Beyond the crossroads, the Royal Mile continues down the Canongate, meaning literally "the canons' way" when it was used in former times by the Augustinian canons of Holyrood Abbey. The street continues downhill past Moray House (now the main academic offices of Moray House School of Education of the University of Edinburgh), the Canongate Tolbooth (now a museum of social history called The People's Story), the Kirk of the Canongate (the Canongate's parish church and a thriving congregation of the Church of Scotland) and the new Scottish Parliament Building to Holyrood Palace and the ruined abbey. Until 1856 the Canongate was not merely a street, but the name of the surrounding burgh, separate from Edinburgh and outside the Flodden Wall.

Abbey Strand

This street is the short approach to Holyrood Palace at the foot of the Canongate. One of the buildings on the north side was the house of Lucky Spence, a notorious brothel madam, remembered in Allan Ramsay's poem, Lucky Spence's Last Advice. On the south side is the Queen's Gallery, used to exhibit items in the Royal collection, in the shell of the former Holyrood Free Church and Duchess of Gordon's School. There are also the remains of the gatehouse of Holyrood Palace built by James IV, with a copy of the royal coat-of-arms of James V set in the wall.

Royal Mile today

Today, the Royal Mile is an eclectic mix of shops, restaurants, pubs and visitor attractions. During the annual Edinburgh Fringe, the High Street becomes crowded with tourists, entertainers and buskers. Parliament Square is at the heart of Scotland's legal system, being the home of both the High Court of Justiciary and the Court of Session.

See also
List of closes on the Royal Mile
Moubray House
Museum of Childhood
Royal Mile police box
Writers' Museum

References

External links
City of Edinburgh Council
Edinburgh Old Town Association

 
Old Town, Edinburgh
Streets in Edinburgh
Tourist attractions in Edinburgh
Busking venues